Little Rock Lake can refer to:

Little Rock Lake (Benton County, Minnesota)
Little Rock Lake (Vilas County, Wisconsin)